Raft is an open world survival video game developed by Swedish developer Redbeet Interactive, and published by Axolot Games. The game was released as an early access title on 23 May 2018 on Steam, after initial release as a free download on indie platform Itch.io in 2016. The game was taken out of early access and its full version was released on 20 June 2022 with the release of the game's final chapter.

Gameplay 
The game is played from the first-person and third-person perspective and can be played either in the single-player or multiplayer mode. With the latter, the server is automatically provided by the game and the game takes place in co-op mode.

After a world is created, the player starts on a 2x2 raft in the middle of an ocean. The player starts only with a hook that they can aim and throw to catch barrels, wood, palm fronds, plastic, crates, and other objects out of the water. The player can leave the raft and collect things while swimming, but must be careful as the raft is always moving due to the continuous ocean current. The player can also be attacked or killed by sharks that are always swimming around the raft. These sharks will also occasionally attack corners of the raft, destroying parts of it.  Using a crafting system, the player can use the collected materials to assemble and research new items and to expand and improve the raft. For example, tools, weapons and nets can be manufactured steering wheel can be made. These can be used control and guide the raft, increase the size and stability of the raft, and defend the raft from the sharks.

The player also needs to manage basic needs like hunger and thirst by catching or growing food and purifying water to drink, but when growing food, the player must shelter the food they're growing due to sea gulls swooping down and eating the seeds. During the game, the raft may pass by islands which the player can explore to get special items and resources. The player can also dive in coastal regions and collect special items.

With the help of a two-way radio, the player unveils the game's storyline, in which the world has been deserted, while the player character is searching for her husband and daughter. On her journey, she discovers various locations, such as an crashed yacht, a large land-mass which seems to be a wildlife reserve, a shantytown built out of scrap metal, and a large dome-like structure floating in the ocean that served as a haven for civilization. The notebook the player acquires at the start tracks story progression, with each major location visited marked with separate entries.

Synopsis

Setting
In the near future, climate change and rising temperatures have caused the polar ice caps to melt, flooding the entire planet and leaving almost no dry land to settle on. Civilization collapsed as desperate plans to reverse the flooding failed or were abandoned. Eventually, the world's elite decided to abandon dry land altogether to live on floating cities, while the rest of the population are left to fend for themselves in a flooded world. 

The player takes on the role of a Forward Scout, a survivor who ventures out into the open sea in search of habitable land and resources.

Plot
With nothing but a simple raft, the Forward Scout sets out into the open ocean in search of a rumored "Utopia" where there it is said there is still dry land to live on. Using a radio receiver, the Forward Scout follows a trail of radio signals. Their first location is a Radio Tower that used to be a nuclear reactor testing site. The Forward Scout then comes across a derelict luxury yacht called the Vasagatan, once owned by Olof Wilkstrom, a government official who was in charge of preventing Sweden from being flooded. However, instead of working on anything meaningful, he built the Vasagatan and fled the country. Despite this, the lack of supplies and a potential mutiny forced Olof to abandon ship and leave the crew to their fate. The Forward Scout is then led to the uninhabited Balboa Island and then to Caravan Town, which was once a bustling island town until its residents were forced to abandon it due to a salmonella outbreak.

The Forward Scout continues to follow the trail of the survivors until they find the abandoned floating city of Tangaroa. Upon searching the city, the Forward Scout learns that the Caravan Town survivors attempted to board Tangaroa, forcing the city's captain to open fire on them. However, the violence sparked violent riots among Tangaroa's population, while at the same time the city's food supplies were destroyed by a beetle infestation and the reactor failed due to stress caused by the captain burning out the engines in an attempt to outrun the Caravan Town survivors. With Tangaroa a lost cause, the entire surviving population abandoned the city. 

The Forward Scout continues on their journey, stopping by an unfinished construction site called Varuna Point and eventually reaching a polar research station on Temperance Island. A search of the research station reveals the location of a major survivor settlement called Utopia, where the Caravan Town and Tangaroa survivors fled to. The Forward Scout heads there, only to find Olof has already reached the city and put it under martial law, locking up all of the residents and setting loose his army of mutated hyenas. The Forward Scout is able to defeat Olof and his hyenas and imprison him. The Utopia residents are freed, and inspired by the Forward Scout, declare that they will do their best to rebuild human civilization.

Development and release 
Raft was developed by three Swedish students from Uppsala University. Development started in 2016 and is still ongoing. On 23 May 2018, Raft was released as a Steam early access game. Raft had previously been distributed on the indie platform Itch.io, where it is still available as a free download for Windows, Linux, and macOS. The Linux and Mac versions were discontinued after version 1.05 due to time constraints. Two weeks after launch the game was the number 3 most played game on Steam and had sold over 400,000 copies. The game updates frequently and new functions are regularly added.

The soundtrack was composed by German composer Jannik Schmidt.

Reception 
Until the end of May 2017 the developer version was downloaded over seven million times. The website Polygon called the game one of the most successful games on Steam of 2018 and praised the mix of exploring, collecting, managing and learning. The game gained fame through numerous Lets Plays on the YouTube video platform, among other events.

The developers told PC Gamer that one reason for the success compared to other survival games that are played in an open world could be the limited area. Due to the sandbox system and the setting on the open sea, the game is also compared with Subnautica.

References

External links 
 
 Free 2016 release of Raft at Itch.io
 

2022 video games
Cooperative video games
Early access video games
First-person video games
Linux games
macOS games
Naval video games
Survival video games
Video games developed in Sweden
Windows games